Igor Grkajac (born 26 April 1987) is a Serbian professional footballer who last played as a striker for Ulaanbaatar City in Mongolia.

Career

Club career
In January 2020, Grkajac joined Ulaanbaatar City in Mongolia under newly hired Serbian coach Vojislav Bralušić.

References

External links

 
 

Sportspeople from Kraljevo
1987 births
Living people
Serbian footballers
Serbian expatriate footballers
Association football forwards
FK Bane players
FK Borac Čačak players
FK Kolubara players
Tvøroyrar Bóltfelag players
FK Mačva Šabac players
FK Metalac Gornji Milanovac players
FK Mladost Lučani players
FK Novi Pazar players
FK Radnički Pirot players
FK Sloga Kraljevo players
FK Smederevo players
FK Timok players
FK Tutin players
Ulaanbaatar City FC players
Serbian First League players
Serbian SuperLiga players
Faroe Islands Premier League players
Serbian expatriate sportspeople in Malta
Serbian expatriate sportspeople in the Faroe Islands
Expatriate footballers in Malta
Expatriate footballers in the Faroe Islands
Expatriate footballers in Mongolia